Mount McGillivray is a  mountain summit located in the Bow Valley of Kananaskis Country in the Canadian Rockies of Alberta, Canada. Its nearest higher peak is Skogan Peak,  to the southeast.  Mount McGillivray is a landmark that can be seen from Highway 1, the Trans-Canada Highway in the Exshaw area.

History

Mount McGillivray was named for Duncan McGillivray (1770-1808), one of the first white men along with David Thompson to see the Bow Valley. In November 1800, McGillivray and Thompson rode south on a trip from the newly established fort at Rocky Mountain House and explored west into the Bow Valley as far as what is now Mount McGillivray in search of the headwaters of the Columbia River. The mountain's name was officially adopted in 1957 by the Geographical Names Board of Canada.

During the Cold War, tunnels and vaults were constructed under the north slope of the mountain as part of a plan to safely store government documents, however the project was never completed.

Geology

Mount McGillivray is composed of sedimentary rock laid down during the Precambrian to Jurassic periods. Formed in shallow seas, this sedimentary rock was pushed east and over the top of younger rock during the Laramide orogeny.

Climate

Based on the Köppen climate classification, Mount McGillivray is located in a subarctic climate with cold, snowy winters, and mild summers. Temperatures can drop below −20 °C with wind chill factors below −30 °C. Precipitation runoff from Mount McGillivray drains into the Bow River which is a tributary of the Saskatchewan River.

Gallery

See also
List of mountains of Canada
Geography of Alberta

References

External links
 Mount McGillivray weather web site: Mountain Forecast

Two-thousanders of Alberta
Canadian Rockies
Alberta's Rockies